Tiago Asahel Palacios (born 28 March 2001) is an Argentine professional footballer who plays as an attacking midfielder for Montevideo City Torque.

Career
Palacios joined the youth system of River Plate in 2011, he remained there for six years before being released in December 2017. In February 2018, Palacios moved to Platense. He signed his first professional contract on 3 January 2020. He was soon promoted into Juan Pablo Pumpido's first-team squad, with his senior debut arriving on 6 March during a home Primera Nacional defeat to Alvarado; he replaced Gonzalo Bazán with twenty-six minutes remaining. His first start came four days later in a Copa Argentina round of sixty-four loss to Deportivo Madryn of Torneo Federal A at the Estadio Ciudad de Caseros.

Palacios made ten appearances in the club's promotion-winning campaign of 2020. On 6 February 2021, Platense revealed that they had reached an agreement with Uruguayan Primera División side Montevideo City Torque for the $380,000 transfer of Palacios. Torque didn't officially announce the acquisition until 22 February, a day after the midfielder had made his Argentine Primera División debut in a victory on the road against Argentinos Juniors. He scored his first senior goal in his third top-flight appearance on 6 March versus Godoy Cruz.

Career statistics
.

Notes

References

External links

2001 births
Living people
Footballers from Buenos Aires
Argentine footballers
Association football midfielders
Argentine expatriate footballers
Expatriate footballers in Uruguay
Argentine expatriate sportspeople in Uruguay
Primera Nacional players
Argentine Primera División players
Club Atlético Platense footballers
Montevideo City Torque players